The Ferrari 315 S was a sports racing car produced by Ferrari in 1957. The model was intended to succeed the Ferrari 290 MM, which had won the 1956 Mille Miglia.

Development

The Ferrari 315 S drivers took the first two positions in the 1957 Mille Miglia, Piero Taruffi being the winner in his last race, followed by Wolfgang von Trips. A 315 S finished third at the Nürburgring and fifth at Le Mans but was then largely replaced by the 335 S. The victory of a Ferrari 335 S in Venezuela and the retirement of the Maseratis granted Ferrari the World Sports Car Championship.

The change in regulations for the World Sports Car championship to a 3-litre engine limit for 1958 meant the 315 S was replaced by the 250 Testa Rossa.

See also
Maserati 450S

References

Bibliography

External links

Ferrari 315 S: Ferrari History

315 S
Sports racing cars
Mille Miglia
24 Hours of Le Mans race cars